Marie Christianne Legentil (born May 27, 1992, in Port Mathurin) is a Mauritian judoka who competes in the women's 52 kg category. At the 2012 Summer Olympics, she won against later double world champion Majlinda Kelmendi and was defeated in the quarter finals. In 2014 and 2015 she was runner up at the African Championships. In 2014, she was winner of the African Open Port Louis 2014 –52 kg. At the 2016 Summer Olympics, she again met Majlinda Kelmendi but this time she lost to the eventual gold medalist in the quarter finals.

In 2019, she competed in the women's 52 kg event at the 2019 World Judo Championships held in Tokyo, Japan.

References

External links
 
 
 
 
 

1992 births
Living people
Mauritian female judoka
Olympic judoka of Mauritius
Judoka at the 2012 Summer Olympics
Judoka at the 2016 Summer Olympics
Commonwealth Games bronze medallists for Mauritius
Judoka at the 2014 Commonwealth Games
Judoka at the 2022 Commonwealth Games
People from Rodrigues
Medallists at the 2022 Commonwealth Games